Der or DER may refer to:

Places
 Darkənd, Azerbaijan
 Dearborn (Amtrak station) (station code), in Michigan, US
 Der (Sumer), an ancient city located in modern-day Iraq
 d'Entrecasteaux Ridge, an oceanic ridge in the south-west Pacific Ocean

Science and technology
 Derivative chromosome, a structurally rearranged chromosome 
 Distinguished Encoding Rules, a method for encoding a data object, including public key infrastructure certificates and keys
 Distributed Energy Resources
 ∂, the partial derivative symbol
Deep energy retrofit, an energy conservation measure

Organizations
 Digital Education Revolution, former Australian Government-funded educational reform program
 DER rental (Domestic Electric Rentals Ltd), a UK television rentals company
 Documentary Educational Resources, a non-profit film producer and distributor

Other uses
Defence (Emergency) Regulations, legal regulations promulgated by the British in Mandatory Palestine in 1945
Department of Environment Regulation, former Western Australian state government department
 Designated Engineering Representative, an individual appointed to approve, or recommend approval, of technical data to the Federal Aviation Administration